Ftena Trachylia ("thin and rough or uneven"), also known as Pinnacle Rocks, are a group of uninhabited Greek islets/rocks, in the Aegean Sea, close to the eastern coast of Crete. Administratively they lie within the Itanos municipality of Lasithi.

The "Trachylia" part of the name was probably given due to the shape of the islet rocks (and many of the islets surrounding Crete are named from their shape). For example, see Trachea (cup-shaped Byzantine coins) and Trachylinae (cup-shaped jellyfish).

See also
List of islands of Greece

Mediterranean islands
Landforms of Lasithi
Uninhabited islands of Crete
Islands of Greece